Samuel Edward Dodge (December 19, 1889 – April 5, 1966) was a relief pitcher in Major League Baseball who played between 1921 and 1922 for the Boston Red Sox. He was born in Neath, Pennsylvania, United States. Neath is a Welsh settlement and is now known only to locals as an area in the eastern district of Pike Township, Bradford County; it no longer appears on most maps.

Dodge posted a 4.50 ERA with three strikeouts and 6.0 innings of work in four appearances. He did not have a decision.

During his mature life, he worked in the lumber camps of upstate New York. In about 1956, Dodge returned to the village of his birth, Neath, Pa. He lived for a winter at the Roy James farm south of Warren Center, working as a farm hand, helping in the saw mill and sleeping in the barn. The instance always reminds this writer - who was 12 years old at the time and also living at the James farm - of Robert Frost's "Death of the Hired Man." Dodge had one sister who may have lived in the Johnson City area. He returned north in New York State and died in Utica, New York, at the age of 76. But his body was returned to be interred at Neath. [wjh, 1/1/2009]

See also
Boston Red Sox all-time roster

References

External links

Boston Red Sox players
Major League Baseball pitchers
Baseball players from Pennsylvania
People from Bradford County, Pennsylvania
1889 births
1966 deaths